Harvey Hutton (10 August 1911 – 27 August 1965) was an Australian cricketer. He played in two first-class matches for South Australia in 1934/35.

References

External links
 

1911 births
1965 deaths
Australian cricketers
South Australia cricketers
Cricketers from Adelaide